Karkachan may refer to:

 The Karakachan dog a livestock guarding dog from Bulgaria
 The Karakachans a redirect from the ethnic group  Sarakatsani